Major-General Sir Charles Max Page KBE CB DSO (1882–1963) was a British surgeon.  He was president of the Association of Surgeons of Great Britain and Ireland in 1946.

Page was commissioned lieutenant in the Royal Army Medical Corps Special Reserve in 1910. He reached the rank of lieutenant-colonel in the First World War and was awarded the Distinguished Service Order in 1918. By 1943 he had reached the rank of major-general and was appointed Knight Commander of the Order of the British Empire (KBE) in 1945 for his services during the Second World War.

In 1945 he delivered the Bradshaw Lecture to the Royal College of Surgeons on the subject of fracture treatment.

References

1882 births
1963 deaths
Knights Commander of the Order of the British Empire
Companions of the Order of the Bath
Companions of the Distinguished Service Order
British Army personnel of World War I
British Army generals of World War II
British Militia officers
Royal Army Medical Corps officers
University of Massachusetts Amherst faculty
Fellows of the Royal College of Surgeons